Nicole Anisi Roberts (born July 16, 1973) is an American former professional soccer player. A midfielder or forward, she represented the Carolina Courage of Women's United Soccer Association (WUSA).

Professional career
Roberts was the Carolina Courage's third round draft pick (22nd overall) ahead of the inaugural 2001 season of the Women's United Soccer Association (WUSA). She missed the entire first season with a broken leg, but was retained for the 2002 season. She made three appearances for the club, logging 65 minutes of playing time before being waived in July 2002.

References

External links
 Profile at Carolina Courage
 Profile at Women's United Soccer Association (WUSA)

Living people
1973 births
American women's soccer players
UMass Minutewomen soccer players
North Carolina Tar Heels women's soccer players
Soccer players from New York (state)
Women's association football forwards
Carolina Courage players
Women's United Soccer Association players
Raleigh Wings players
USL W-League (1995–2015) players